Rolando Abel Martín (born September 23, 1968, in Maryland, United States) is an Argentine former rugby union footballer and a current coach.

He was a part of the Pumas' famous back row of the modern era. His career includes three Rugby World Cups and 76 Tests for the national side. He retired from international rugby after the 2003 Rugby World Cup in Australia.

Martín played his first international match for Argentina on May 28, 1994, in Long Beach against the USA. Argentina won the game 20–18. He played his last international match on October 26, 2003, in Adelaide in the 16–15 defeat to Ireland. Martin played a total of 86 games for Argentina, scoring 95 points.

Martin represented Argentina at three Rugby World Cups, in 1995, 1999 and 2003.

During his time with San Isidro Club in Argentina, he won in 4 URBA championships: 1993, 1994, 1997 and 1999.

He is currently the head coach of San Isidro Club.

References

External links
 La16 profile
Puma Rolando Martin to retire after World Cup
The great back row combinations

1968 births
People from Maryland
Argentine rugby union players
Living people
Rugby union flankers
Argentina international rugby union players
San Isidro Club rugby union players
Argentine rugby union coaches
Argentine expatriate rugby union players
Expatriate rugby union players in England
Argentine expatriate sportspeople in England
Richmond F.C. players